Andy Earl may refer to:

 Andrew Earl (climber), English climber and coach
 Andy Earl (rugby union) (born 1961), New Zealand rugby union player
 Andrew Earl (volleyball) (born 1982), Australian volleyball player